Wahan Ke Log is a 1967 Hindi science fiction film. Directed by Nisar Ahmed Ansari, the film stars Pradeep Kumar, Tanuja,  Johnny Walker. One of the earliest sci-fi films made in India, it tells the story of a supposed martial threat on India by aliens from outer space intending to rob the rich of their diamonds. Made on a low budget, the film was promoted with the tagline "The strange visitors from Mars are on the way".

Plot
Agent Rakesh is assigned by Chief Sheikh of the Central Intelligence Service to investigate the murder case of Dinanath from Karolbagh, with speculation of a possible involvement of aliens from Mars. Rakesh, who lives with his mother and is to marry Anita, embarks on a journey to Bombay along with private detective Neelkanth, from Blue Bird Detective Agency.

Cast
Pradeep Kumar as Rakesh / Prince Ranveer Singh  
Tanuja as Anita  
Johnny Walker as Neelkanth 
Shobhna Samarth as Rakesh's Mother  
D. K. Sapru as Shaikh 
Neelofar as Margaret 
Nisar Ahmad Ansari as Professor Anil Chakravarty
Hari Shukla as Dwarka Prasad  
Bela Bose as Sophia  
Laxmi Chhaya as Dancer
M. A. Latif as Inspector Latif
Viju Khote as Spaceship Pilot

Soundtrack
The music was composed by C. Ramchandra. The lyrics were written by Shakeel Badayuni. The songs are as follows:

Reception
A review carried by Link magazine was critical of the film, writing: "Credibility is not by any means its forte and there is very little in its length to distinguish it from the stock brew that Bombay is known to bottle under various labels". Being one of the only sci-fi pictures from India, the film has been discussed by a number of scholars. According to Sami Ahmad Khan, author of the essay Bollywood's Encounters with the Third Kind, Wahan Ke Log seems to have taken inspiration from the Sino-Indian War which took place five years before, even though no mention of China is made in the film. The Times of India listed the film as one of India's "Super C grade movies", dismissing it as the worst of India's sci-fi films. A retrospective review by The Hindu, however, called it "an unusual film, an interesting blend of a ghost and thieving aliens".

References

External links

1960s Hindi-language films
1967 films
Alien invasions in films
Films scored by C. Ramchandra
Films shot in India
I
Hindi-language science fiction films